Igor Marchenko may refer to:

Igor Marchenko (figure skater) (born 1977), retired Ukrainian pair skater
Igor Marchenko (swimmer) (born 1975), Russian swimmer